Emily Pritt is an American long-distance runner.

High school career
She was a multiple-time district champion at Jackson High School in Stark County, Ohio.

College career
For the NC State Wolfpack she was a cross-country All-American.

International career
She competed in the 2009 IAAF World Cross Country Championships in the Junior women's race where she finished 44th.

Pritt also competed at the 2017 IAAF World Cross Country Championships.

References

External links

Living people
American female long-distance runners
Year of birth missing (living people)
21st-century American women